Guido Gino Titotto is a Canadian retired soccer player who earned one cap for the Canadian national side in 1989. He played club football for Vancouver 86ers, Cliff Avenue United and Columbus FC.

External links
 
 Player profile at FIFA
 All Time Vancouver Whitecaps player and coach registry

Living people
Canadian soccer players
Vancouver Whitecaps (1986–2010) players
Canadian Soccer League (1987–1992) players
American Professional Soccer League players
Canada men's international soccer players
Canadian people of Italian descent
Canada men's youth international soccer players
Canada men's under-23 international soccer players
Association football forwards
Year of birth missing (living people)